Edmundo Iván Vázquez Mellado Pérez (born 14 December 1982) is a Mexican professional footballer who plays as a goalkeeper.

Career
Vázquez Mellado joined Necaxa in 2004, after having played for Correcaminos UAT in the Primera División A. He debuted for the club on August 14, 2004, in a match against Toluca, which his team lost 1–0.

Vázquez Mellado became the first player to score a goal in the Copa Mexico, scoring from a free kick against Querétaro F.C.

Honours
Necaxa
Ascenso MX: Apertura 2009, Bicentenario 2010

Juárez
Ascenso MX: Apertura 2015

León
Leagues Cup: 2021

References

External links

Edmundo Ivan Vazquez (FOX Sport)
Iván Vázquez

1982 births
Living people
Correcaminos UAT footballers
Club Necaxa footballers
FC Juárez footballers
Liga MX players
Footballers from Mexico City
Association football goalkeepers
Mexican footballers